Srđ is a low mountain just behind the walled city of Dubrovnik in Dalmatia, Croatia. At its top is a large white stone cross and Fort Imperial, a defensive structure built by the French in 1810 during the Napoleonic Wars. Srđ is popular with tourists as a viewpoint from which it is possible to see the walled city of Dubrovnik, Lokrum island, the Adriatic Sea and various local attractions (including restaurants and the Stradun).

Srđ was once forested with oak trees which locals called dubrava (from the old Slavic word dub, "oak tree"), after which the city of Dubrovnik was named. The southern slope was once rich with pine forests, but in the second half of the 20th century and during the 1991–95 Croatian War of Independence, the forest was almost completely gutted through numerous fires. A zigzag Calvary leads up from the town.
The mountain was home to one of the fiercest battles of the Independence War, namely the Siege of Dubrovnik, and this is commemorated in a museum in Fort Imperial. The television mast was destroyed by fighter aircraft from the Yugoslav Air Force. The cable car that was disabled during this time has since been reopened, and Srđ has been developed as a tourist attraction, with a restaurant and a base for buggy safaris.

References

External links
 200 years of Fort Imperial atop of Mount Srđ

Dubrovnik
Mountains of Croatia
Hills of Croatia
Landforms of Dubrovnik-Neretva County
Tourism in Dubrovnik